HD 87643 is a B[e] class binary star embedded in a reflection nebula.

The system is described as having "one of the most extreme infrared excesses for this object class". It harbours a large amount of both hot and cold dust, and is surrounded by a debris disk with radius 2.5-3 AU and an extended reflection nebula. and is important for astronomers in their study of stellar formation.

All the properties of HD 87643 are highly uncertain.  Its distance has been estimated anywhere from one to six kpc.  The General Catalogue of Variable Stars classifies it as an Orion variable, a pre-main sequence star, but other authors consider it to be a supergiant B[e] star.  It has been confirmed to be a binary star system with the two stars separated by about 52 AU, but the nature of the companion is unknown.

References

External links
The field around HD 87643

Binary stars
Nebulae
B-type supergiants
087643
Carinae, V640
Carina (constellation)
Circumstellar disks
J10043028-5839521
CD-58 03005
Orion variables
B(e) stars